Gangwal is a surname. Notable people with the surname include: 

Mala Ram Gangwal (born 1949), Indian politician
Mishrilal Gangwal (1902–1981), Indian politician
Rakesh Gangwal (born 1952/1953), Indian-American billionaire businessman